George Truitt (1756 – October 8, 1818) was an American farmer and politician from Murderkill Hundred, in Kent County, Delaware, near Felton. He was a member of the Federalist Party, who served in the Delaware General Assembly and as Governor of Delaware.

Early life and family
Truitt was born in Murderkill Hundred, Kent County, Delaware, near Felton. His Father was Samuel Truitt, b.1733 Worcester, Maryland d.1788 Worcester, Maryland his Mother was Ester Sturgis b.1737 Somerset County, Maryland d.1777. he was certainly a descendant of a George Truitt who settled in Accomack County, Virginia in the 17th century. He married Margaret "Mary" Hodgson and they had one child, Sarah. Their farm and primary residence was later known as Frazier Farm and is located east of Felton on the Canterbury Road, now State Route 15. They also had a home at 12 South Main Street in Camden. They were members of the Methodist Church.

Professional and political career
He began his political career as a delegate to the state convention which ratified the United States Constitution of 1787. He then served five years in the state house from the 1788/89 session through the 1791/92 session and again in the 1794 session. He then served most of two terms in the state senate, from the 1803 session through the 1807 session. In 1807 he was elected Governor of Delaware, defeating Joseph Haslet the Democratic-Republican Party candidate. Truitt took office January 19, 1808 and served until January 15, 1811.

Like other governors, Truitt was concerned about issues like slavery, penal reform, and public education. A new issue arose during his term, however. Due to increasing tensions with Great Britain, the U.S. government had directed Delaware to create and equip a militia of 1300 men. The General Assembly, in turn requested Federal fortification of Wilmington, New Castle, Port Penn, Reedy Island, and Lewes.
Being descendant of George Truitt 1640 who landed in Va. on a land grant from Kind George of England. Who exchanged his land in Northern England for the tract in the New world.

Death and legacy
Truitt died at his farm in Murderkill Hundred, Kent County, near Felton and was buried there. In 1903 he was reburied in the Barratt's Chapel Cemetery near Frederica, Delaware. The Gov. George Truitt House was listed on the National Register of Historic Places in 1978.

No known portrait of George Truitt exists.

Almanac
Elections were held October 1 and members of the General Assembly took office on October 20 or the following weekday. State assemblymen had a one-year term.

Beginning in 1792 elections were held the first Tuesday of October and members of the General Assembly took office the first Tuesday of January. The State Legislative Council was renamed the state senate and the State House of Assembly became the State House of Representatives. State senators had a three-year term and state representatives had a one-year term. The governor takes office the third Tuesday of January and had a three-year term.

References

External links
Biographical Directory of the Governors of the United States
Delaware’s Governors

The Political Graveyard'

Places with more information
Delaware Historical Society; website; 505 North Market Street, Wilmington, Delaware 19801; (302) 655-7161
University of Delaware; Library website; 181 South College Avenue, Newark, Delaware 19717; (302) 831-2965
Barrat's Chapel Cemetery; 6416 Bay Road, Frederica, Delaware; (302) 335-5544

1756 births
1818 deaths
Methodists from Delaware
People from Kent County, Delaware
Delaware Federalists
Members of the Delaware House of Representatives
Delaware state senators
Governors of Delaware
Burials in Kent County, Delaware
Federalist Party state governors of the United States
People of colonial Delaware